The 1958 World Modern Pentathlon Championships were held in Aldershot, Great Britain.

Medal summary

Men's events

Medal table

See also
 World Modern Pentathlon Championships

References

 Sport123

Modern pentathlon in the United Kingdom
World Modern Pentathlon Championship, 1958
World Modern Pentathlon Championship, 1958
International sports competitions hosted by England
20th century in Hampshire
Multisports in the United Kingdom